A list of films produced in Egypt in 1958. For an A-Z list of films currently on Wikipedia, see :Category:Egyptian films.

External links
 Egyptian films of 1958 at the Internet Movie Database
 Egyptian films of 1958 elCinema.com

Lists of Egyptian films by year
1958 in Egypt
Lists of 1958 films by country or language